The 2013 Naiste Meistriliiga was the 21st season of women's league football in Estonia.

The league was won by Pärnu JK, its 4th consecutive title and 9th overall. By winning, Pärnu qualified to 2014–15 UEFA Women's Champions League.

League clubs

The following clubs are competing in Naiste Meistriliiga during the 2015 season:

Format
The 7 teams played each other twice for a total of 12 matches, with the top six teams qualifying for a championship round, where teams played each other once, bringing the total to 17 matches.

League table

Regular season

Championship group

Top scorers

Source:

References

External links
Naised Expert Liga 2013 jalgpall.ee 
 Estonia (Women) 2013 RSSSF.com
2013 Meistrliiga Women (regular season) Soccrway

Estonia
Estonia
2013 in Estonian football
Naiste Meistriliiga